Sakkara is an ancient burial ground in Egypt.

Sakkara may also refer to:
 Abba Sakkara (1st century), an insurrectionary leader of Palestine
 Sakkara (novel), a superhero novel by Michael Carroll
 Sakkara, one of the names of the comic-book character Purgatori

See also 
 Saccara (disambiguation)
 Sakara (disambiguation)